Kristi Lynn Noem (née Arnold; born November 30, 1971) is an American politician who has served as the 33rd governor of South Dakota since 2019.

First elected governor in 2018, Noem is South Dakota's first female governor. During the 2018 election, she was endorsed by then-president Donald Trump. As governor, Noem rose to national prominence during the COVID-19 pandemic over her refusal to issue a statewide mask mandate. Noem has been characterized as a potential presidential or vice presidential candidate in the 2024 election.

Early life and education 
Kristi Noem was born to Ron and Corinne Arnold in Watertown, South Dakota, and was raised with her siblings on their family ranch and farm in rural Hamlin County. She has Norwegian ancestry. Noem's father was killed in a farm machinery accident. Noem added a hunting lodge and restaurant to the family property. Her siblings moved back to help expand the businesses.

Noem graduated from Hamlin High School in 1990, and was the South Dakota Snow Queen. She attended Northern State University from 1990 to 1994, but left college early to run the family farm after her father's death. Subsequently, Noem took classes at the Watertown campus of Mount Marty College and at South Dakota State University, and online classes from the University of South Dakota. She completed her degree in political science at SDSU in 2012 while serving in Congress.

South Dakota House of Representatives
In 2006, Noem won a seat as a Republican in the South Dakota House of Representatives, representing the 6th district (comprising parts of Beadle, Clark, Codington, Hamlin, and Kingsbury counties). In 2006, she won with 39% of the vote. In 2008, she was reelected with 41%.

Noem served for four years, from 2007 to 2010; she was an assistant majority leader during her second term. During her tenure, Noem was the prime sponsor of 11 bills that became law, including several property tax reforms and two bills to increase gun rights in South Dakota. In 2009, she served as vice chair of the Agriculture Land Assessment Advisory Task Force. Senator Larry Rhoden chaired the task force and later served as her lieutenant governor.

U.S. House of Representatives

Elections

2010 

In 2010, Noem ran for South Dakota's at-large seat in the U.S. House of Representatives. She won the Republican primary with a plurality of 42 percent of the vote against South Dakota Secretary of State Chris Nelson and State Representative Blake Curd. Her primary opponents endorsed her in the general election.

Noem's opponent, incumbent Democratic U.S. Congresswoman Stephanie Herseth Sandlin, emphasized her own record of independence from the Democratic caucus, including her votes against health care reform, the Wall Street bailouts, and the cap-and-trade energy bill. In response, Noem repeatedly highlighted Herseth Sandlin's vote for Nancy Pelosi as Speaker of the House. During the 2010 election cycle, Noem outraised Herseth Sandlin, $2.3 million to $2.1 million. Noem defeated Herseth Sandlin, 48 to 46 percent.

2012 

Noem was reelected to a second term, defeating Democrat Matthew Varilek, 57–43 percent.

2014 

Noem was reelected to a third term, defeating Democrat Corinna Robinson, 67–33 percent.

2016 

Noem was reelected to a fourth term, defeating Democrat Paula Hawks, 64–36 percent.

Tenure 

The 2011 House Republican 87-member freshman class elected Noem as liaison to the House Republican leadership, making her the second woman member of the House GOP leadership. According to The Hill, her role was to push the leadership to make significant cuts to federal government spending and to help Speaker John Boehner manage the expectations of the freshman class. In March 2011, Republican Representative Pete Sessions of Texas named Noem one of the 12 regional directors for the National Republican Congressional Committee during the 2012 election campaign.

After being elected to Congress, Noem continued her education through online courses. The Washington Post dubbed her Capitol Hill's "most powerful intern" for receiving college intern credits from her position as a member of Congress. She earned a B.A. in political science from South Dakota State University in 2012.

On March 8, 2011, she announced the formation of a leadership political action committee, KRISTI PAC. Former South Dakota Lieutenant Governor Steve Kirby is its treasurer. Noem was among the top freshman Republicans in PAC fundraising in the first quarter of 2011, raising $169,000 from PACs.

Energy and environment

Noem has said that the U.S. needs an "all-of-the-above energy approach" that includes renewables like wind and ethanol while still realizing the need for a "balanced energy mix" that ends American dependence on foreign oil.

Noem supported the Keystone XL Pipeline and supports offshore oil drilling. She co-sponsored three bills that she argued would reduce American dependence on foreign oil by ending the 2010 United States deepwater drilling moratorium in the Gulf of Mexico and reopening sales on oil leases in the Gulf and off the coast of Virginia. In 2011, she sponsored a measure to block Environmental Protection Agency funding for tighter air pollution standards for coarse particulates.

She supports the current designation of the land as a national grassland. She pointed out that the land is already managed as roadless areas similar to wilderness and argued that changing the land's designation to wilderness would further limit leaseholder access to the land and imperil grazing rights.

Foreign affairs

From 2013 to 2015, Noem served on the House Armed Services Committee, where she worked on the 2014 National Defense Authorization Act. Her appointment to the committee was seen as a benefit to South Dakota's Ellsworth Air Force Base. In March 2011, Noem was critical of President Obama's approach to the NATO-led military intervention in the 2011 Libyan civil war, calling on him to provide more information about the U.S.'s role in the conflict and characterizing his statements as vague and ambiguous. Obama has since called the Libya debacle the "worst mistake" of his presidency.

Health care
Noem opposes the Affordable Care Act (Obamacare) and has voted to repeal it. Having unsuccessfully sought to repeal it, she sought to defund it while retaining measures such as the Indian Health Care Improvement Act, the provision allowing parents to keep their children on their health insurance plan into their 20s, and the high-risk pools. Noem wanted to add such provisions to federal law as limits on medical malpractice lawsuits and allowing patients to buy health insurance plans from other states. She supported cuts to Medicaid funding proposed by Republican Budget Committee chairman Paul Ryan. A study found that this action would reduce benefits for South Dakota Medicaid recipients by 55 percent.

Immigrants and refugees
Noem supported President Donald Trump's 2017 Executive Order 13769 that suspended the U.S. refugee program for 120 days and banned all travel to the U.S. by nationals of seven Muslim-majority countries for 90 days. She said she supported a temporary ban on accepting refugees from "terrorist-held" areas, but "did not address whether she supports other aspects of the order, which led to the detention of legal U.S. residents such as green-card holders and people with dual citizenship as they reentered the country" in the aftermath of the order's issuance.

Taxes
In 2017, Noem was on the conference committee that negotiated the passage of the Tax Cuts and Jobs Act, which she touted as giving the average South Dakota family a $1,200 tax cut.

In 2018, Noem was reported to have "pitched the idea to members of the conservative House Freedom Caucus" to attach her online sales tax bill to the government funding package as part of an omnibus. A court case under consideration in the South Dakota Supreme Court involved requiring "certain out-of-state retailers to collect its sales taxes." Noem said that South Dakota businesses (and by extension businesses nationwide) "could be forced to comply with 1,000 different tax structures nationwide without the tools necessary to do so", adding that her legislation "provides a necessary fix."

Noem has called the budget deficit one of the most important issues facing Congress. She cosponsored H. J. Res. 2, which would require that total spending for any fiscal year not exceed total receipts. She cited the Environmental Protection Agency, the Department of Veterans Affairs, Medicaid, high-speed rail projects, cap-and-trade technical assistance, and subsidies for the Washington Metro rapid transit system as examples of federal programs where she would like to see cuts.

In 2011, Noem indicated that she would vote to raise the federal debt ceiling, but only if "tied to budget reforms that change the way we spend our dollars and how Washington, D.C., does business. It won’t just be a one-time spending cut." She ultimately voted for S. 365, The Budget Control Act of 2011, which allowed then-President Obama to raise the debt ceiling in exchange for spending cuts to be decided by a bipartisan committee. She also said she wanted to eliminate the estate tax, lower the corporate tax rate, and simplify the tax code. She said she would not raise taxes to balance the budget.

Committee assignments
 Committee on Ways and Means
 Subcommittee on Human Resources
 Subcommittee on Select Revenue Measures

Caucus memberships

 Republican Study Committee
 Congressional Cement Caucus
 Congressional Arts Caucus
 Afterschool Caucuses
Congressional Western Caucus

Governor of South Dakota

Elections

2018 

On November 14, 2016, Noem announced that she would run for governor of South Dakota in 2018 rather than seek reelection to Congress. She defeated South Dakota Attorney General Marty Jackley in the June 5 Republican primary, 56 to 44 percent, and Democratic nominee Billie Sutton in the general election, 51.0 to 47.6 percent.

2022 

On November 12, 2021, Noem announced that she was running for reelection as governor. On November 17, 2021, State Representative Steven Haugaard announced that he was running for governor against Noem. On February 1, 2022, House Democratic Minority Leader Jamie Smith announced he was seeking the Democratic nomination for governor.

Tenure
Noem was sworn in as governor of South Dakota on January 5, 2019, the first woman in that office in the state.

Abortion
Noem is anti-abortion. She has the support of the anti-abortion group Susan B. Anthony List and has said she intends to maintain her 100% anti-abortion voting record.

Noem has signed several bills restricting abortion, saying that the bills would "crack down on abortion providers in South Dakota". She also said, "A strong and growing body of medical research provides evidence that unborn babies can feel, think, and recognize sounds in the womb. These are people, they must be given the same basic dignities as anyone else."

Following the overturning of Roe v. Wade, South Dakota became one of the first states to enact trigger laws banning abortions. In an interview on CNN's State of the Union, Noem defended South Dakota's abortion ban, which only allows exceptions in cases in which the mother's life is in danger. When asked about the case of the 10-year-old child abuse victim who traveled from Ohio to Indiana in order to receive an abortion, Noem said that she would not support changing the law to allow exceptions for victims of rape, explaining that she does not "believe a tragic situation should be perpetuated by another tragedy."

Anti-protest legislation
In response to protests against the Keystone Pipeline, Noem's office collaborated with the energy company TransCanada Corporation to develop anti-protest legislation, which Noem signed into law in March 2019. The law created a fund to cover the costs of policing pipeline protests. Another law was passed to raise revenue for the fund by creating civil penalties for advising, directing, or encouraging participation in rioting. The Pine Ridge Indian Reservation banned Noem from their grounds as a result. The Indigenous Environmental Network, Sierra Club, and other groups challenged the laws in suits, arguing that the laws violated First Amendment rights by incentivizing the state to sue protesters. In 2020, Noem brought additional legislation to repeal sections of the previous bill and clarify the definition of "incitement to riot".

Conflict of interest action to professionally benefit daughter
In July 2020, after Noem's 26-year-old daughter, Kassidy Peters, was denied a real estate appraisal license, Noem summoned to her office Sherry Bren, a state employee who had directed South Dakota's Appraiser Certification Program for 30 years. Additional attendees included Peters, Noem's chief of staff Tony Venhuizen, Department of Labor Attorney Amber Mulder and Labor Secretary Marcia Hultman. By telephone the group was joined by the governor's general counsel, Tom Hart, and a lawyer from the state's Department of Labor and Regulation, Graham Oey. A week later, Hultman demanded Bren's resignation. Bren repeatedly, but unsuccessfully, tried to resolve the issues short of resigning, eventually filing an age discrimination complaint. She received a $200,000 settlement as part of a nondisclosure agreement to withdraw her complaint and leave her position.

Noem's spokesperson Ian Fury characterized the allegations as an example of how Noem cuts through "bureaucratic red tape". Noem responded to a public airing of the charges by writing, "Listen I get it. I signed up for this job. But now the media is trying to destroy my children" and "This story is just another example of the double standard that exists with the media... going after conservatives and their kids while ignoring Liberals." Fury contended, "The Associated Press is disparaging the Governor's daughter in order to attack the Governor politically – no wonder Americans' trust in the media is at an all-time low."

After the Associated Press published a story about the incident, the State Senate's Government Operations and Audit Committee was delegated to investigate the situation. The attorney general, Republican Jason Ravnsborg, was tasked with providing guidance to the legislature as to their deliberations. In April 2021, Noem had called for Ravnsborg's resignation after release of details of an investigation into the death of a pedestrian he had hit with his car. After his refusal to tender his resignation, in June 2022, on his impeachment, state senators convicted Attorney General Ravnsborg on two counts of official malfeasance and by a bipartisan 31–2 vote, barred him from ever holding office again in the state.

In October 2021, the Government Operations and Audit Committee invited Secretary of the Department of Labor Marcia Hultman and Sherry Bren to come before the committee to discuss the appraisal program in light of the controversy surrounding the program, Noem, Noem's daughter, and a $200,000 payout to Bren for an age discrimination claim.

On December 14, 2021, Bren testified before the Government Operations and Audit Committee. She said that Peters received an Agreed Disposition around March/April 2020. Around July 20, 2020, Peters received a letter and/or Findings of Fact and Conclusions of Law when she failed to meet the requirements of the Agreed Disposition. Bren said she was told by Department of Labor attorney Amber Mulder on July 26, 2020, to be prepared to discuss "What is the definition of a serious deficiency; what criteria do you use for denials; how many are denied each year; how many are approved; are we saying that Kassidy can take certain classes and resubmit." Bren said she felt "very nervous" and "intimidated" when meeting with Noem and numerous attorneys and Labor Secretary Hultman. Bren mentioned during the meeting at the mansion some appraisal classes that she thought would be helpful to Peters. Bren said that Noem was upset that she was just now hearing about the classes. Bren testified that the decision to depart from recognized upgrade procedures and offer a third opportunity would be Hultman's. Bren said this was beyond the recognized procedures and "not normal."

On November 1, 2021, the Government Accountability Board set an agenda to discuss this issue and another issue based on complaints brought by Ravnsborg. On December 15, 2021, the Government Accountability Board referred one of the two complaints to Noem for a response and sent the other back to the complainant for further information. On February 3, 2022, the Government Accountability Board referred the second complaint to Noem for a response and gave her until April 15, 2022, to answer both pending complaints.

On February 24, 2022, Republican State Representative John Mills introduced House Resolution 7004, "Addressing the Governor's unacceptable actions in matters related to the appraiser certification program", against Noem. On March 1, the resolution was debated and failed by a margin of 29 to 38 with three excused, including Noem's primary opponent Steven Haugaard and U.S. House candidate Taffy Howard.

COVID-19 pandemic
During the COVID-19 pandemic in South Dakota, Noem at first was responsive to containment strategies. As President Donald Trump began to actively resist governmental interventions, she segued to a hands-off approach. She used pandemic relief funds in November 2020 to promote tourism during a surge in cases in the state. She did not implement face mask mandates, raised doubts about the efficacy of mask-wearing, encouraged large gatherings without social distancing or mask-wearing, and questioned the advice of public health experts. As of December 2020, she was one of few governors who had not maintained statewide stay-at-home orders or face-mask mandates. Her response mirrored Trump's rhetoric and handling of COVID-19. She was rewarded for her COVID-19 response with a speech at the August 2020 Republican National Convention, which elevated her national profile. The Argus Leader described the RNC speech as a "defining moment in her political career."

Early in the pandemic, Noem requested that the legislature pass a bill giving the state health secretary and county officials the power to close businesses and other entities. The House rejected the bill. On March 13, 2020, Noem ordered K-12 schools to close, and on April 6, she extended that order for the remainder of the school year. Also on April 6, Noem ordered businesses and local governments to practice social distancing and other CDC guidelines.

Early on, Noem also emphasized South Dakota's role in evaluating hydroxychloroquine, an antimalarial drug that Trump had touted when he tweeted, "HYDROXYCHLOROQUINE & AZITHROMYCIN, taken together, have a real chance to be one of the biggest game-changers in the history of medicine." It has never been shown to be useful in treating COVID-19 but can produce fatal cardiac arrythmia.

One of the largest COVID-19 outbreaks in the U.S. at the time occurred in South Dakota. The Smithfield Foods production plant in Sioux Falls had four deaths, with nearly 1,300 workers and their family members testing positive. Secretary of Health and Human Services Alex Azar misinformed a group of legislators that meatpacking plants employees were not likely to be infected at work, but that their "home and social" habits were spreading the contagion. Noem may have been the first officeholder to publicly express that view. On April 13, 2020, of an outbreak where hundreds of workers had tested positive at a Smithfield pork plant, she told Fox News, "We believe that 99 percent of what's going on today wasn't happening inside the facility". The industry didn't explain the deaths from COVID-19 of USDA food-safety inspectors from three plants. Almost 200 inspectors contracted symptomatic COVID-19. In the pandemic's early days, the Food Safety and Inspection Service did not provide protective equipment to its monitors, forbidding them from wearing masks in the slaughterhouses as it feared that might accentuate the risks. On April 9, 2020, the agency said its inspectors would be allowed to wear masks if the meatpacking plants' owners gave the federal employees permission to do so. Inspectors were expected to supply their own masks. A month later, after publication of the risk for spreading the coronavirus, the USDA at last started giving its inspectors masks. Noem had said that the plant was in full operation as an essential food manufacturing facility. Forty-eight of Smithfield's workers were hospitalized. On April 6, Noem issued an executive order that said people "shall" follow guidance from the Centers for Disease Control and Prevention; she also ordered everyone over age 65 in Minnehaha and Lincoln counties to stay home for three weeks.

Noem did not mandate social distancing or the wearing of face masks at a July 3 event at Mount Rushmore with Trump present. Health experts warned that large gatherings without social distancing or mask-wearing posed a risk to public health. Noem doubted scientific recommendations on the usefulness of masks. In an opinion piece in the Rapid City Journal, she defended her views, citing analysis by the Association of American Physicians and Surgeons, a group known for promoting pseudoscience. The Association of American Physicians and Surgeons had called vaccination the equivalent of "human experimentation." COVID-19 patients hospitalized on October 22 reached a record high of 355, including 75 in Intensive Care Units. South Dakota's two largest hospital systems rescheduled elective procedures to increase available space and personnel to accommodate the surge. In the absence of a statewide mask mandate, hospital systems urged people to wear masks while in the company of those outside their own households. Sioux Falls Mayor Paul TenHaken advised his constituents, "Wear a dang mask."

Sixteen weeks after Trump's executive order that provided enhanced weekly unemployment benefits of $300 as part of the U.S. federal government response to the pandemic, Noem opted out of the program, citing a low state unemployment rate. South Dakota was the only state to refuse the assistance. Its jobless rate in June was 7.2 percent, up from 3.1 percent in March, though down from 10.9 percent in April. Acceptance of the funding required the state to augment the benefit by $100 unless other jobless assistance allowed the match to be waived.

In February 2020, Noem announced her opposition to a bill prohibiting schools and universities from requiring students to get vaccinated. In May 2021, she signed an executive order prohibiting government facilities from requiring proof of vaccination to access services, a policy she called "un-American." In August 2021, Noem opposed legislation proposed by Republican state legislators Jon Hansen and Scott Odenbach that would prohibit businesses from requiring vaccinations as a condition for employment.

Noem supported the annual Sturgis Motorcycle Rally in August 2020, despite warnings from experts that it could spread COVID-19. Nearly 500,000 bikers attended the event. Public health notices were issued for saloons and other businesses in the Sturgis area. By the end of August, dozens of cases linked to attendance at the event were reported in several states.

In September 2020, amid a surge of new cases, Noem announced that she would spend $5 million of relief funding on a state tourism campaign. She used $819,000 of those funds to have the state's Department of Tourism run a 30-second Fox News commercial she narrated during the 2020 Republican National Convention. During September, over 550 students became infected at South Dakota universities; 200 more cases were reported in K–12 schools.

In October 2020, as South Dakota reported the country's second-highest number of new COVID-19 cases per capita and hospitals began to prioritize treatment of severe COVID-19 cases over lesser ones, Noem said the higher case numbers were because of more testing, despite the positive test rate and hospitalization rate also increasing.

In February 2021, Noem signed a bill limiting civil liability for certain exposures to COVID-19. The bill exempts health care providers and other businesses, including those selling personal protective equipment, from lawsuits unless COVID-19 exposure was the result of gross negligence, recklessness, or willful misconduct.

In July 2021, Noem criticized other Republican governors for enacting mandatory measures against COVID-19 and trying to "rewrite history" about it. She argued that South Dakota had effectively combated the pandemic by instead testing and isolating cases; in fact, South Dakota had the 10th-highest death rate and third-highest case rate at that time.

Department of Corrections
In July 2021, Noem placed Secretary of the Department of Corrections Mike Liedholt on administrative leave, and fired South Dakota State Penitentiary Warden Darin Young and Deputy Warden Jennifer Dreiske, after receiving an anonymous note with complaints regarding pay, medical coverage and instances of sexual harassment. Liedholt later announced his retirement. Later that month, after meeting with prison employees, despite lingering COVID-19 cases, Noem ended the prison's mask mandate. In August 2021, Noem announced that the CGL Group, a California-based company, was being hired for $166,410 to do a comprehensive review of the Department of Corrections operations. At the same time, the director of the prison work program was fired, and two other DOC employees relieved of their duties.

The prison work program director, Stephany Bawek, subsequently filed a complaint with the U.S. Equal Employment Opportunity Commission (EEOC), alleging that she was retaliated against for reporting sexual harassment by Young. On March 14, 2022, Bawek filed a lawsuit in federal district court alleging that she was fired for reporting incidents of sexual harassment in the workplace.

Deployment of South Dakota National Guard to southern border (2021)
In June 2021, Noem announced that she was sending members of the South Dakota National Guard to Texas's border with Mexico. Tennessee billionaire Willis Johnson and his wife Reba said they would donate the money necessary for the deployment. On September 22, 2021, the Center for Public Integrity sued the South Dakota National Guard and the U.S. Department of Defense in the federal district court in the District of Columbia to obtain documents about the deployment and the donation. The 2022 National Defense Authorization Act banned National Guard members from crossing state borders to perform duties paid for by private donors.

Fireworks at Mt. Rushmore lawsuit (2021)
In 2021, Noem sued U.S. Secretary of the Interior Deb Haaland, seeking to have fireworks at Mount Rushmore for Independence Day. (Fireworks displays had been halted at the site in 2009 by the National Park Service due to fire risks and other reasons.) Noem hired the private Washington D.C. law firm Consovoy McCarthy to bring the case, with South Dakota state taxpayer money paying for the suit. The U.S. District Court dismissed the suit, with Judge Roberto Lange finding that four of the five reasons given by the NPS and Secretary Haaland were valid. On July 13, Noem filed an appeal with the 8th Circuit Court of Appeals.

On March 14, 2022, the National Park Service again denied Noem's application for a permit to have fireworks at Mt. Rushmore for the 4th of July, citing opposition from Native American groups and the possibility of wildfires.

Governor's mansion spending
In May 2019, Noem proposed to build a fence around the governor's mansion, estimated to cost approximately $400,000, but retracted the proposal. In 2020, the 2019 project was revived; a senior Noem advisor told the media that the decision was based on the recommendations of Noem's security team. In late November 2021, it was reported that Noem spent $68,000 of taxpayer dollars on imported rugs from India, chandeliers and a sauna for the mansion.

Guns
In 2019, Noem signed a bill into law abolishing South Dakota's permit requirement to carry a concealed handgun. In 2022, Noem sought to build a gun range in Meade County with government funds, but the legislature rejected it.

LGBTQ rights
Noem opposes same-sex marriage. In 2015 she said she disagreed with Obergefell v. Hodges, the Supreme Court's ruling that same-sex marriage bans are unconstitutional.

On March 8, Noem announced on Twitter that she would sign into law H.B. 1217, the Women's Fairness in Sports Bill, which bans transgender athletes from playing on or against women's school and college sports teams. Some critics of the bill say they are worried it might turn away business and cost the state money. On March 19, Noem issued a style and form veto to H.B. 1217 that substantially altered the bill, not just correcting grammar and spelling mistakes. She appeared on "Tucker Carlson Tonight" seeking to defend her position. On March 29, the South Dakota House rejected Noem's style and form veto, 67–2. After the House returned H.B. 1217 to Noem for consideration after the House rejected her veto, she vetoed H.B. 1217. The House then failed to override her veto by a vote of 45-24 (47 votes were needed to override). Numerous conservative commentators criticized Noem for vetoing the bill.

In December 2021, Noem and her office signaled their support for an anti-trans bill called "An Act to protect fairness in women's sports." The bill would require young athletes to join teams that aligned with their biological sex at birth.

In 2021, Noem signed a religious refusal bill into law; the legislation amended the state RFRA to allow businesses owners to cite religious beliefs as a basis to deny products or services to people on the basis of sexual orientation or gender identity. The legislation, S.B. 124, was criticized by civil rights groups who said it would enable discrimination against LGBTQ+ people, women, and members of minority faiths. This bill was the first major state RFRA law signed into law in six years and resembles the 2015 bill signed into law by Indiana Governor Mike Pence.

"Meth. We're on It" campaign
On November 18, 2019, Noem released a meth awareness campaign named "Meth. We're on It". The campaign was widely mocked and Noem was criticized for spending $449,000 of public funds while hiring an out-of-state advertising agency from Minnesota to lead the project. She defended the campaign as successful in raising awareness.

Opposition to cannabis legalization 
In 2020, Noem opposed two ballot measures to legalize cannabis for medical use and recreational use in South Dakota, saying, "The fact is, I've never met someone who got smarter from smoking pot. It's not good for our kids. And it's not going to improve our communities." After both measures passed, she and two police officers filed a lawsuit seeking a court decision against the measure legalizing recreational use, Amendment A. On February 8, 2021, circuit court judge Christina Klinger struck down the amendment as unconstitutional. After the ruling, she also sought to delay the implementation of the medical marijuana initiative for a year. Ultimately, her efforts failed and medical marijuana became legal on July 1, 2021.

Noem has also opposed the cultivation of industrial hemp, vetoing a bill that passed the South Dakota House and Senate in 2019 to legalize hemp cultivation. She said, "There is no question in my mind that normalizing hemp, like legalizing medical marijuana, is part of a larger strategy to undermine enforcement of the drug laws and make legalized marijuana inevitable."

2020 presidential election
Noem claimed that the 2020 presidential election, in which Joe Biden defeated Donald Trump, was marred by widespread voter fraud; no evidence supports this claim. On December 8, 2020, Noem tacitly acknowledged the outcome of the election when she referred to a "Biden administration" during her annual state budget address, but even after Biden was inaugurated in January, she still refused to accept that the election was "free and fair." Noem was initially designated to be one of Trump's three presidential electors for South Dakota, but later withdrew. In 2020 the Trump-Pence ticket carried South Dakota, receiving 261,043 votes to 150,471 for the Biden-Harris ticket.

After the U.S. Capitol was attacked by a pro-Trump mob on January 6, 2021, disrupting the counting of the electoral votes formalizing Biden's victory, Noem spoke out against the violence, saying, "We are all entitled to peacefully protest. Violence is not a part of that." One day after calling for peace and reconciliation in the aftermath of the assault on the Capitol, Noem called the two newly elected Democratic senators from Georgia, Jon Ossoff and Raphael Warnock, "communists" in an op-ed for The Federalist, prompting criticism from South Dakota Democrats.

RV Park in Custer State Park proposal
In 2022, Noem sought to put a government paid RV park in Custer State Park. The proposal was met with significant opposition to include government competing with private business and disturbing the pristine nature of the park. The House Agricultural and Natural Resources deferred the bill to the 41st day, effectively killing it, by a vote of 9–3.

School prayer bill
In 2022, Noem sought to have prayer put back in school after mentioning it in a speech in Iowa. On January 21, 2022, the "prayer bill", HB 1015, was defeated in the House Education Committee by a vote of 9–6. An aide to Noem admitted to the committee that no schools were consulted about the proposal.

Staff
On November 19, 2021, Noem named her fifth chief of staff, Mark Miller, to replace outgoing chief of staff Aaron Scheibe. Scheibe served as chief of staff from May 1 to November 19, 2021. Tony Venhuizen preceded Scheibe from March 2, 2020, to April 23, 2021. Josh Shields preceded Venhuizen from October 1, 2019, to January 1, 2020. Herb Jones was Noem's first chief of staff, serving from January 5 to October 1, 2019.

Trade
In February 2019, she said that the Trump administration's trade wars with China and the European Union had devastated South Dakota's economy, particularly the agricultural sector, "by far" the state's largest industry.

Breaking tradition 
In 2023, Noem broke a decades-old South Dakota tradition. The governor of South Dakota traditionally sits with the state press to discuss policy initiatives and take questions at the beginning of each year. Noem has been unavailable to state media, but has been taking interviews with national television stations.

Electoral history

Personal life 
She married Bryon Noem in 1992, in Watertown, South Dakota. They have three children. In 2011, when Noem moved to Washington to take her congressional office, her family continued to live on a ranch near Castlewood, South Dakota.

Noem is a Protestant. As of 2018, her family attended a Foursquare Church in Watertown, South Dakota.

Noem published her autobiography, Not My First Rodeo: Lessons from the Heartland on June 28, 2022.

See also
 List of female governors in the United States
Women in conservatism in the United States
 Women in the United States House of Representatives

References

External links 

 Official site of the Governor of South Dakota
 Kristi Noem for Governor
 
 
 

|-

|-

|-

|-

|-

|-

1971 births
21st-century American politicians
21st-century American women politicians
American beauty pageant winners
American hunters
American people of Norwegian descent
American Pentecostals
Businesspeople in agriculture
Christians from South Dakota
Farmers from South Dakota
Female members of the United States House of Representatives
Living people
Members of the Foursquare Church
Northern State University alumni
People from Watertown, South Dakota
People from Hamlin County, South Dakota
Protestants from South Dakota
Ranchers from South Dakota
Republican Party members of the South Dakota House of Representatives
Republican Party members of the United States House of Representatives from South Dakota
Republican Party governors of South Dakota
South Dakota State University alumni
Women in South Dakota politics
Women state governors of the United States
Women state legislators in South Dakota
Beauty queen-politicians